The Cremona–Fidenza railway is a railway line in Italy.

History
The line was opened on 12 September 1906  and operated by the private railway company Società Italiana Ferrovie e Tramvie (SIFT). Later it came to the state company Ferrovie dello Stato (FS).

It was electrified at the end of the 1970s, in order to provide an alternative route (via Treviglio, Cremona and Fidenza) for the freight trains from Milan to the south. The electrical service started on 27 May 1979.

See also
 List of railway lines in Italy

References

Bibliography
 RFI - Fascicolo linea 30

External links

Railway lines in Emilia-Romagna
Railway lines in Lombardy
Railway lines opened in 1906
Cremona
1906 establishments in Italy